Pauline Clayden (born 12 October 1922) is a British retired ballerina. 

Clayden was born in Greenwich, London on 12 October 1922. She studied at the Cone School of Dancing. Peggy van Praagh, who had spotted her among the Cone students, had recommended her to Antony Tudor's London Ballet. Tudor selected her rather than some of the Cone teachers' own favourites. He cast her in a dance for four women in the Covent Garden Aida - the only time she worked with him, as he departed for the United States soon after. She moved on to the Ballet Rambert and, finally, as a soloist with Sadler's Wells Ballet from 1942 to 1956. 

Clayden married Major H. J. Gamble in 1948. She created roles in Ninette de Valois' Promenade, Robert Helpmann's Miracle in the Gorbals, Frederick Ashton's Tiresias and Cinderella, John Cranko's Bonne-Bouche and Andrée Howard's Veneziana. She also danced many of the roles originally created for Margot Fonteyn, already established although only three years older than Clayden.

Clayden turned 100 on 12 October 2022.

References

1922 births
Living people
Dancers of The Royal Ballet
Rambert Dance Company dancers
British centenarians
Women centenarians